The Shree Diamond Public Academy Higher Secondary School) is a school in Gaddachauki, Nepal. It was founded in 1996.

The school was founded by Hira Chand when he was just 16 years old. At that time there was no English medium school in Gaddachauki, 
Schools in Nepal
Educational institutions established in 1996
1996 establishments in Nepal